Francis Heaney is a professional puzzle writer and editor (and a former editor-at-large) for GAMES Magazine, as well as a former editor of Enigma, the official publication of the National Puzzlers' League, the composer and co-lyricist (with playwright James Evans) of the Off-Off-Broadway musical We're All Dead, and the author of the webcomic Six Things.

Heaney finished in third place in the 2007 and 2009 American Crossword Puzzle Tournament out of approximately 700 participants. He won Lollapuzzoola 8 in 2015, after making the finals (but not winning) four previous times (2009, 2012, 2013, and 2014).

In 2004, he published Holy Tango of Literature, a collection of his literary parodies which had previously appeared in Modern Humorist.

References

Crossword compilers
Living people
Year of birth missing (living people)